Diane Armstrong (born 1939) is an Australian novelist, biographer and freelance journalist and travel writer.

Early life and move to Australia 
Armstrong was born Danuta Julia Boguslawski in 1939 in Kraków, Poland, the family moving to Lwów soon after the Nazi invasion. She came to Australia on the SS Derna with her parents in November 1948, clearing customs in Melbourne, before disembarking in Brisbane. Six months later the family moving to Sydney. Her father was a dentist who had to re-qualify before he could practice in Australia.

Awards and recognition 
 National Biography Award, shortlisted for Mosaic
 Victorian Premier's Prize for Nonfiction, shortlisted for Mosaic
 New South Wales Premier's Literary Awards, Douglas Stewart Prize for Non-Fiction, shortlisted for The Voyage of Their Lives
 Commonwealth Writers' Prize, Best First Book, South East Asia and South Pacific Region, shortlisted for the Winter Journey, 2006
 Society of Women Writers, New South Wales, SWW Book Awards, winner for Nocturne, 2009

Works

Non-fiction 

 Mosaic: A Chronicle of Five Generations, Random House, Sydney, 1998 ; St Martin's Press, New York, 2001 
 The Voyage of Their Lives: The Story of the SS Derna and its Passengers, Flamingo, Sydney, 2001

Fiction 
 Nocturne, Fourth Estate, London, 2008 
 Winter Journey, Fourth Estate, Sydney, London & New York, 2005 
 Empire Day, HarperCollins, Sydney, 2011 ; Fourth Estate, London, 2011 
 The Collaborator, HarperCollins, Sydney, 2019

References

External links 
 Official website

1939 births
Holocaust survivors
Polish emigrants to Australia
Australian Jews
Living people